Bercy is an area of south east Paris. 

Bercy may also refer to
 Bercy (Paris Métro) a station at the intersection of the Boulevard de Bercy and the Rue de Bercy
 Gare de Bercy, a station specialising in auto-trains
 Ministry for the Economy and Finance (France), often informally referred to as Bercy, where the Ministry is located.
 Palais Omnisports de Paris-Bercy, a sports stadium
 Paris Masters, a tennis Masters 1000 held annually in the Palais Omnisports de Paris-Bercy
 Pont de Bercy, a bridge over the Seine
 Sauce Bercy, in cooking, a sauce derived from Velouté sauce